Frank Jörg Richter  (born 22 September 1964 in Hanover, West Germany) is a German Olympic rower who won a silver and bronze medal. He is a triple-world champion with the German men's eight.

References

Olympic rowers of Germany
Rowers at the 1992 Summer Olympics
Rowers at the 1996 Summer Olympics
Olympic bronze medalists for Germany
1964 births
Living people
Olympic medalists in rowing
German male rowers
Medalists at the 1996 Summer Olympics
Medalists at the 1992 Summer Olympics
Olympic silver medalists for Germany
World Rowing Championships medalists for West Germany
World Rowing Championships medalists for Germany
Sportspeople from Hanover